The Superprestige Diegem is a cyclo-cross race held in Diegem, Belgium, which is part of the Superprestige. Since 2007, the race is held in the evening under artificial lighting, which is rare.

Past winners

References

External links
 
 Results

Cyclo-cross races
Cycle races in Belgium
Recurring sporting events established in 1975
1975 establishments in Belgium
Cyclo-cross Superprestige
Sport in Flemish Brabant
Machelen